Gilbert was a Norman Count of Gravina from 1159 until 1167. His father Bertrand was the illegitimate son of Rotrou III, Count of Perche. He was a cousin of Margaret of Navarre, the queen of Sicily. He arrived in Sicily sometime around 1159 and, through Margaret's influence, was created Count of Gravina in Apulia immediately.

Late in that same year, Gilbert joined a conspiracy of nobles, including Richard of Aquila, Roger of Acerra, and Bohemond of Tarsia, Count of Manoppello. The conspiracy was of only minor lords, but it gained traction. The aim of the conspirators was to assassinate Maio of Bari and in this they succeeded on 10 November 1160. The rebellion which followed was short-lived in Sicily, and Gilbert was one of the barons restored to favour, along with Bohemond.

However, on the peninsula, the rebels, led by Andrew of Rupecanina, Robert of Loritello and Tancred of Lecce, marched on Butera and burned it. King William himself entered the field against Tancred, his nephew, while Gilbert held the Campania for him.

Gilbert took advantage of the death of William in 1166 to pressure his cousin, the regent, into giving him a high position at court. Gilbert became the personal enemy of Margaret's chief minister, the caïd Peter, and plotted his downfall and death. Peter fled Sicily and reconverted to Islam. However, Margaret still ignored her cousin and appointed one Richard of Mandra, who had saved her late husband's life, count of Molise and chancellor. Gilbert promptly turned on him and the two met for a duel, but were separated before combat could begin. At that point, to rid Palermo of him, Margaret sent Gilbert to the peninsula as catepan of Apulia and Campania to prepare for a possible invasion of Frederick Barbarossa.

The year 1166 also saw the arrival of Rodrigo, Margaret's brother and Gilbert's cousin, from Navarre. Rodrigo was sent to Apulia with the name Henry and the title Count of Montescaglioso and there he stayed briefly with Gilbert.

In 1167, Barbarossa finally sent an army into the Campania. This army first established the Antipope Paschal III at Viterbo to prevent Pope Alexander III from reaching Rome. Gilbert defeated the invasive imperial forces and sent them back into Tuscany. Barbarossa himself besieged Ancona, but the appearance of Gilbert's army south along the Adriatic coast forced him to abandons the siege.

Later in that year, an uncle of Gilbert's, Stephen du Perche, chancellor and Archbishop of Palermo, who had visited Gravina a year earlier, secretly sent for Gilbert's army to support him at Messina. At a council in Messina, Henry of Montescaglioso was accused by Gilbert of conspiring against the chancellor. Evidence of a confession was duly provided and the Navarrese count was imprisoned in Reggio Calabria. Gilbert, now high in favour, successfully got the count of Molise, an old adversary, arrested as well. Gilbert left with his army; but Messina was in an uproar.

Messina revolted and freed the imprisoned Count Henry. The insurrection spread and the people of Palermo forced the removal of Stephen du Perche. This accomplished, an interim council was set up to assist the regent. The council exiled Gilbert and he joined Stephen on crusade, taking his wife and son, Bertrand of Andria, with him.

References

Sources

Norwich, John Julius. The Kingdom in the Sun 1130-1194. Longman: London, 1970.
History of the Tyrants of Sicily at Patrologia Latina.

Year of birth missing
Year of death missing
12th-century deaths
Italo-Normans
Norman warriors
Christians of the Crusades